Marc Anderson is an American musician who has been performing since the 1970s

Marc Anderson may also refer to:

Marc A. Anderson (born 1945), American chemist
 Marc Andreessen (born 1971), American entrepreneur
 Marc Anderson, American Army ranger killed in 2002 at the Battle of Takur Ghar in Afghanistan
 Marc Anderson, editor for the 1962 film The Brain That Wouldn't Die

See also
Mark Anderson (disambiguation)